Edward Holland (born 28 June 1936) is a retired  Anglican bishop, who was the Suffragan Bishop in Europe and then the area Bishop of Colchester. He is now an honorary assistant bishop in both the Diocese of London and the Diocese in Europe.

Early life
Holland was born on 28 June 1936 and educated at Dauntsey's School and trained for the priesthood at King's College London, becoming an Associate of King's College (AKC).

Ordained ministry
Holland was ordained a deacon in 1965 and a priest in 1966. His first ministry position after ordination was as a  curate at Holy Trinity, Dartford. He then served at John Keble Church, Mill Hill. before a period in the Mediterranean.

Holland was precentor at Gibraltar Cathedral and then chaplain of Christ Church, Naples. He returned to London to be vicar of St Mark's, Bromley, before his ordination to the episcopate.

Episcopal ministry
Holland was consecrated as a bishop on 22 July 1986, by Robert Runcie, Archbishop of Canterbury, at Southwark Cathedral. His first episcopal appointment made use of his experience as the suffragan bishop ("Suffragan Bishop in Europe") of the Diocese in Europe, a diocese often described simply as "in Europe". The suffragan bishop in Europe assists the diocesan bishop. Holland served in this ministry for nine years.
 
Holland returned to the United Kingdom in 1995, to the Diocese of Chelmsford as Bishop of Colchester. That see is also one of a suffragan bishop, but this diocese is one in which the see is divided into discrete areas of administration (since 1983), so the bishop is more often referred to as an area bishop.

Views
In February 2012, Holland signed an open letter calling for the Church of England to allow its priests to officiate at civil partnership ceremonies in their churches if their conscience allows them to. It was suggested that this would work in the same was as the remarriage of divorced couples, in that no priest would be forced to do so if their conscience did not allow it.

Later life
In retirement since 2001, Holland is an honorary assistant bishop in both the Diocese of London and the Diocese in Europe.

References

1936 births
People educated at Dauntsey's School
Alumni of the Theological Department of King's College London
Anglican suffragan bishops in Europe
Bishops of Colchester
20th-century Church of England bishops
21st-century Church of England bishops
Living people
Associates of King's College London